Riding-like sitting or balanced sitting includes a sitting posture that approaches the natural resting position. 
A forward sloping seat encourages this natural posture, which is the same as when lying on the side while sleeping. The lumbar curve is preserved, the joint angles are open, and muscles are well-balanced and relaxed. This position is exactly the same as when riding a horse: the rider sits upright and at the same time maintains a lumbar lordosis because of the downwards sloping thighs.

Riding-like sitting or balanced seating is the most suitable position for long periods of sitting. Forward sloping seats and higher desks can eliminate lower back strain and even prevent chronic back pain. It also relieves pressure on the lungs and stomach and provides greater mobility.  The advantages compared to conventional furniture in terms of pain, flexion and comfort are documented in several scientific studies starting with research by A C Mandal, MD, and recently reviewed, updated and discussed by T Mandal with several references to research and the revised European (CEN) standards for educational furniture that includes balanced seating options.

See also 
 Partial squat

Further reading 
 
  [invalid link]
 Torsten Mandal 2009 Better furniture types for work and studies reduces bending and pain. Published at Association for Bodyconscious Design (expanded version of a proceeding article).  

Ergonomics
Partial squatting position
Sitting